The Dolphin's Cry is a 1987 Soviet science fiction film directed by Alexey Saltykov, based on the book by Nikolai Cherkashin "The Mystery of Archelon" "("The Dolphin's Cry").

Plot
The crew of the new American strategic missile submarine "Archelon" is struck by an unknown virus. The command must decide on removing the submarine from combat duty and sending the crew to quarantine. The cause of the disease is discovered to be leakage of one of the warheads. There are no treatments and the crew is confined to the ship until an antidote is found.

Symptoms of the disease are similar to leprosy, and like leprosy, the disease lasts for a long time. "Archelon" as a result is under quarantine for about three years. The ship's psychologist observes the sailors are affected by barely restrained unmotivated aggression, and with every passing day it becomes more difficult for the captain to preserve at least the appearance of order. Eventually, the captain can no longer withstand the prolonged torture of this strange disease; after unsuccessful attempts to board the ships enforcing quarantine of "Archelon", he fakes the destruction of his submarine and gives the order to sink the passing vessels. In the end, he decides to destroy the whole mankind and release rockets equipped with the virus. At the last moment, the captain changes his mind and sends the boat into a vertical dive to the bottom of the ocean.

Cast
Ivars Kalniņš – Reeflint
Donatas Banionis – Bar-Mattai
Armen Dzhigarkhanyan – steward
Yuri Vasiliev – O'Gregor
Paul Butkevich – Roop
Tatyana Parkina – Nika
Nadezhda Butyrtseva – Magda
Vilnis Becheris – doctor
Vladimir Shubarin – Barney
Romualds Antsans – Eppel
Vladimir Episkoposyan – Sam
Vytautas Tomkus – general
Rostislav Yankovsky – minister
Vitaly Yakovlev – submariner
Andrey Podoshyan – Jack
Sergey Roshynets is a navigator
K. Mitaishvili – Fleggi
I. Pogodin – Katarina
M. Tolpigo – violist

References

External links

Soviet science fiction films
1980s science fiction films
Mosfilm films
1987 films
1980s Russian-language films
Films about infectious diseases
Films about viral outbreaks